The arrondissement of Haguenau-Wissembourg is an arrondissement of France in the Bas-Rhin department in the Grand Est region. It has 141 communes.

Composition

The communes of the arrondissement of Haguenau-Wissembourg are:

Aschbach
Batzendorf
Beinheim
Bernolsheim
Berstheim
Betschdorf
Biblisheim
Bietlenheim
Bilwisheim
Bischwiller
Bitschhoffen
Brumath
Buhl
Cleebourg
Climbach
Crœttwiller
Dalhunden
Dambach
Dauendorf
Dieffenbach-lès-Wœrth
Donnenheim
Drachenbronn-Birlenbach
Drusenheim
Durrenbach
Eberbach-Seltz
Engwiller
Eschbach
Forstfeld
Forstheim
Fort-Louis
Frœschwiller
Gambsheim
Geudertheim
Gœrsdorf
Gries
Gumbrechtshoffen
Gundershoffen
Gunstett
Haguenau
Hatten
Hegeney
Herrlisheim
Hochstett
Hœrdt
Hoffen
Hunspach
Huttendorf
Ingolsheim
Kaltenhouse
Kauffenheim
Keffenach
Kesseldorf
Kilstett
Kindwiller
Krautwiller
Kriegsheim
Kurtzenhouse
Kutzenhausen
Lampertsloch
Langensoultzbach
Laubach
Lauterbourg
Lembach
Leutenheim
Lobsann
Memmelshoffen
Merkwiller-Pechelbronn
Mertzwiller
Mietesheim
Mittelschaeffolsheim
Mommenheim
Morsbronn-les-Bains
Morschwiller
Mothern
Munchhausen
Neewiller-près-Lauterbourg
Neuhaeusel
Niederbronn-les-Bains
Niederlauterbach
Niedermodern
Niederrœdern
Niederschaeffolsheim
Niedersteinbach
Oberbronn
Oberdorf-Spachbach
Oberhoffen-lès-Wissembourg
Oberhoffen-sur-Moder
Oberlauterbach
Oberrœdern
Obersteinbach
Offendorf
Offwiller
Ohlungen
Olwisheim
Preuschdorf
Reichshoffen
Retschwiller
Riedseltz
Rittershoffen
Rœschwoog
Rohrwiller
Roppenheim
Rothbach
Rott
Rottelsheim
Rountzenheim-Auenheim
Salmbach
Schaffhouse-près-Seltz
Scheibenhard
Schirrhein
Schirrhoffen
Schleithal
Schœnenbourg
Schweighouse-sur-Moder
Seebach
Seltz
Sessenheim
Siegen
Soufflenheim
Soultz-sous-Forêts
Stattmatten
Steinseltz
Stundwiller
Surbourg
Trimbach
Uhlwiller
Uhrwiller
Uttenhoffen
Val-de-Moder
Wahlenheim
Walbourg
Weitbruch
Weyersheim
Windstein
Wingen
Wintershouse
Wintzenbach
Wissembourg
Wittersheim
Wœrth
Zinswiller

History

The arrondissement of Haguenau-Wissembourg was created in January 2015 by the merger of the former arrondissements of Haguenau and Wissembourg. At the same time, it absorbed two communes from the arrondissement of Saverne and 18 communes from the former arrondissement of Strasbourg-Campagne.

References

Haguenau-Wissembourg